Hollyweird is an album by the band Poison.

Hollyweird may also refer to:
Live in Hollyweird, an album by the band Unwritten Law
Hollyweird, a 1999 film directed by Penelope Spheeris
pejorative expression for Hollywood